Józef Górny (17 March 1936 – 24 August 2013) was a Polish  footballer who played as a forward. Starting his career with Lechia Gdańsk he made his debut in the 1956 season,  going on to make 19 appearances in the I liga. After his breakthrough season he joined Zawisza Bydgoszcz as a result of his mandatory military service. He returned to Lechia Gdańsk in 1959, but failed to make another first team appearance for the club during the next two seasons, leaving Lechia after the 1960 season. It is unknown if Górny still played football for a club between 1961 and 1963 or whether he took a break from playing football altogether, but it is known he returned to playing football in 1964 and played for RKS Stocznia Północna over the next five seasons, retiring from playing football in 1969. After retiring he held coaching roles with the Lechia Gdańsk youth teams.

References

1936 births
2013 deaths
Lechia Gdańsk players
Zawisza Bydgoszcz players
Polish footballers
Association football forwards